Menegazzia magellanica is a species of foliose lichen from South America. It was described as a new species in 1942 by Swedish lichenologist Rolf Santesson.

See also
 List of Menegazzia species

References

magellanica
Lichen species
Lichens described in 1942
Lichens of South America
Taxa named by Rolf Santesson